Immigration Law Practitioners Association is a United Kingdom professional association of lawyers and academics practising in or concerned about immigration, asylum and nationality law.

The association has been actively involved in developing policy and providing legal aid to immigrants.

References

External links 
 

Immigration to the United Kingdom